Edward Loure is a Tanzanian tribal activist. He is a member of the Maasai people. Loure was awarded the Goldman Environmental Prize in 2016, for his efforts of defending the Maasaian traditional way of life, which has been threatened by commercial tourism.

References

Maasai people
20th-century Tanzanian people
Indigenous peoples and the environment
Living people
Year of birth missing (living people)
Tanzanian environmentalists
Goldman Environmental Prize awardees